Ihar Khmelyuk (: born 27 January 1990) is a Ukrainian-born Belarusian former professional footballer.

References

External links

1990 births
Living people
Belarusian footballers
Ukrainian footballers
Ukrainian expatriate footballers
Association football midfielders
FC Minsk players
FC Slonim-2017 players
FC Molodechno players
Sportspeople from Volyn Oblast